Eviota hoesei, Doug's eviota, is a species of goby associated with reefs and tide pools. Within this limited area this is an abundant species.

Like most members of its genus, this is a tiny fish reaching a length of  SL. Coloration seems to vary with depth: those found near to the surface tend to be green while those found at depths of 18 m or deeper tend to be red. The most prominent diagnostic feature is two dark spots at the base of the pectoral fin.

The specific name honours the ichthyologist Douglass Fielding Hoese of the Australian Museum in Sydney who has made an important contribution to the study of fishes in the order Gobiiformes.

References

hoesei
Taxa named by Anthony C. Gill
Taxa named by Susan L. Jewett
Fish described in 2004